Remington is a small hamlet and census-designated place (CDP) in Hamilton County, Ohio, United States. It is adjacent to Loveland, Indian Hill, and Camp Dennison and is considered part of the Greater Cincinnati area. It is included in the Indian Hill Exempted Village School District. The population of Remington was 368 at the 2020 census.

Geography

Demographics

References

Census-designated places in Hamilton County, Ohio
Census-designated places in Ohio